Secret of the Stars, known as  in Japan, is a role-playing video game released in 1993 and developed and published by Tecmo for the Super Nintendo Entertainment System.

Gameplay

Secret of the Stars uses a turn-based RPG battle system where actions in battle are selected through a menu and actions are presented at the end of the turn. Gameplay switches between two parties throughout the game and certain areas are inaccessible without the right party.

Plot
The main character Ray and his party of Aqutallion warriors embark on a quest to find and destroy Homncruse, the evil power threatening their world. Ray begins his journey alone on a tiny island, but eventually he meets his friends and fellow Aqutallion warriors: Tina, Cody, Leona and Dan, and even creates a town for the victims of Homncruse's evil to live. Villains encountered along tend to range from comical, such as Cat Boo and Badbad, to the more sinister elite generals of Homncruse.

Initially all the teens are considered Pennon, the lowest rank of warrior. Before they can destroy Homncruse each of them must undergo a trial at their respective temples hidden around the world to receive the secondary powers of Banalet. Dan is an exception because he is the descendant of the Prosperous Wise Man clan of Aqutallion. When Ray, Tina, Cody, and Leona achieve the status of Banalet and are united by the powers of Dan, Aqutallion is reborn and the group gains incredible powers.

The Aqutallions are not alone: eleven members of Kustera can be recruited to fight for the young warriors in their place for a time being. The Kustera are mostly meant to serve as a supplement to the Aqutallions, but their role in the story is vital to its progression. From the same temples where the Aqutallions gain their Banalet status, there is a Kustera only warp icon that sends the group to a dungeon where great treasures are hidden.

Characters
The Aqutallion
Ray -- The leader of the Aqutallion warriors. Like typical protagonists, Ray has well rounded stats, but with a slight lean towards physical. His element is Fire.  
Tina -- The first friend Ray discovers on his journey. Tina is a typical support style character. Her physical attributes are lacking, but she gains access to several support and healing based spells. Her element is Ice. 
Cody -- The second friend to be discovered. Cody is the tank of the group. He is the strongest team member physically, but lacks speed and magic power, although he does get access to a useful power up support spell. Cody's element is Wind. 
Leona -- The third friend. Leona is the fastest of the five warriors and can use some swords and claws. Her element is Lightning.
Dan -- The fourth and final friend to be discovered. Unlike the other four, Dan is not Aquitallion. Instead his title is Prosperous Wiseman. As a result, he cannot perform combination attacks like the other four. He is also incredibly frail physically, but he makes up for these shortcomings with access to some of the best healing and attack magic in the game. Dan's attack magic "Bomb" is non-elemental based, so he has no specific element. 

The Kustera
David -- David serves as an early mentor for Ray on his home island and leads Ray to his starcrest. David is a purely physical character who cannot use spells, but has a wide range of weapons and armor he can equip.
Ryu -- After restoring the people of Beegees to their human forms, Ryu becomes available for recruitment in the town. Ryu is a ninja, which means he is exceptionally fast and can equip certain unique weapons. He also has access to some low level attack and healing spells
Ben -- When arriving in Decates, Ben's wife can enlist the party's help in bringing Ben out of his drunken stupor to fight once again. Ben is a priest, and has a spell and equipment selection very similar to Tina's.
Andy -- The boxer from Box Town who joins the party after the player defeats him and his brother. Like David, Andy is purely physical attacker, however he has a much more limited selection of weapons and armor to choose from.
Arthur -- Andy's brother who resides in the town of Sleepers. Arthur is the exact opposite of Andy. He is very physically frail but has a wide range of attack magic he can use.
Jubei -- A samurai warrior from Onsaka. He is recruited after the party defeats him. Jubei is another purely physical character. He has a wide selection of weapons to choose from, as well as a couple unique samurai weapons only available to him.
Murray -- A wizard trapped in Moreyees. Murray joins the party once he is freed from the curse keeping him prisoner. Like Arthur, he is very frail physical, but can use powerful magic spells.
Shark -- Found in a small house in the area of Bonzley. Shark will join the party only when all five Aqutallion warriors are together (after getting Dan essentially). Shark is very similar to David, having no magic but wielding a variety of weapons and armor.
Evelyn -- The bunny thief in Elekees. Evelyn is like Leona, except she cannot use magic.
Kathy -- An Archer from the female town of Amaboss. Kathy is another physical character, except she uses bows as her weapons.
Beth -- A medic from the female town of Amaboss. Beth is a powerful healer, but has no access to attack spells.

The villains
Cat Boo -- The first available boss fight in the game. Cat Boo is originally an optional boss fight on Ray's home island. On the main continent Cat Boo becomes a common enemy.
Badbad -- The leader of the Badmen. He has used a Dog Pill to turn the citizens of Beegees into dogs, and has the only other Dog Pill that can return them to normal.
Ringo Brothers: Bingo and Leech -- These are lieutenants of Homncruse who have kidnapped the children from neighboring towns and are holding them for Homncruse.
Garados -- The owner of the circus, and another lieutenant of Homncruse. He has kidnapped Cody and transformed him into a Lion to keep the Aqutallions from reuniting.
Dram -- The 1st General of Homncruse. Dram is a giant man covered in plate mail and wielding giant axes. He is sent to destroy Dan, and ultimately prevent Aqutallion from being reborn.
Booth -- The 2nd General of Homncruse. He is a troll like creature who wears a white hood and cloak. Booth is responsible for the destruction of Alazina, the town closest to his castle.
Gara -- The 3rd General of Homncruse. The only female general, and the only general to look like a normal human. Gara is the sorceress who maintains rule of the city of Amaboss from her castle.
Godem -- The 4th General of Homncruse. A winged dragon like creature, Godem is responsible for the destruction of the Aqutallions Temples (though not the dungeons beneath them).
Homncruse -- The source of evil in the game and enemy in the final boss fight. His name may be a corruption of "Homunculus", and his creator Parakless a corruption of "Paracelsus".

Reception

Secret of the Stars received moderately positive reviews. On release, Famicom Tsūshin scored the game a 19 out of 40. The four reviewers of Electronic Gaming Monthly were critical of the graphics, but felt that the highly involving story more than made up for them. They scored the game a 7.25 out of 10. GamePro praised the game's monster designs, calling it "X-Files with a sense of humor." However, they considered the game's winning feature to be its combination of accessible gameplay mechanics with heavy challenge, summarizing that "kiddie characters and an easy-to-use RPG design will appeal to young beginners, but the epic-length adventure and multitude of monsters will challenge wily RPG vets."

References

External links

Secret of the Stars at GameFAQs
Secret of the Stars ending

1993 video games
Fantasy video games
Role-playing video games
Super Nintendo Entertainment System games
Super Nintendo Entertainment System-only games
Video games developed in Japan
Tecmo games